Arpajon-sur-Cère (literally Arpajon on Cère;  or just ) is a commune in the Cantal department in the Auvergne region of south-central France.

The inhabitants of the commune are known as Arpajonnais or Arpajonnaises

Geography
Arpajon-sur-Cère is located immediately to the south of Aurillac some 70 km south-east of Brive-la-Gaillarde. The town is an extension of the urban area of Aurillac. Access to the commune is by the D920 from Aurillac which continues south to Lafeuillade-en-Vézie. The D990 also goes from south of the town to Vézac in the east. The D58 comes from Giou-de-Mamou in the north-east then goes south-west from the town to the Château de Conros and joins the D617 at the south-western border of the commune. Much of the runway of Aurillac – Tronquières Airport is in the commune. A railway passes through the north of the commune but the nearest station is in Aurillac. Apart from the town there are the villages and hamlets of:

Carbonnat
Esmoles
Le Pont
Roquetorte
Douarat
Le Bousquet
Crespiat
Le Cambon
Le Sal
Les Granges
Lapeyrusse
Carsac
Combelles
Senilhes
Les Quatre Routes
Toules

Outside the residential areas there are extensive forests in the south and south-west with the rest of the commune farmland.

The Jordanne river flows from Aurillac to join the Cère just south-west of the town with the Cère continuing west to eventually join the Dordogne at Girac.

Neighbouring communes and villages

Toponymy
The name Arpjon originates from the Gallic word Arpaionem which is composed of the word arepo meaning "plough". It was attested in 923 in the form: vicaria arpajonensis. In Carladézien dialect, Arpajon is pronounced Olpotsou, according to a recording there in 2007.

History

The Dejou Féniès & son and Lartigue companies were established in the commune in the 20th century manufacturing wood especially Jouets Dejou (Dejou Toys) which are highly sought after by Doll collectors.

Heraldry

Administration

List of Successive Mayors

Twinning
Arpajon-sur-Cère has twinning associations with:
 Blyth (United Kingdom) since 1990.
 Bougouni (Mali).

Demography
In 2017 the commune had 6,217 inhabitants.

Sites and Monuments

The commune has several sites and buildings that are registered as historical monuments:
The Birthplace of Général Milhaud at 1 Avenue du Général-Milhaud (1753)
The old Pont-de-Mamou Mill on Rue Jean-Jaurès (1772)
The Château de Conros (15th century)
The Château de Conros Park
The Château de Carbonat Park
The Château de Limagne Garden

Other sites of interest
Barrière hamlet where Louis Laparra de Fieux was born.
The Cabrières bridge, a hamlet and a bridge which once had a toll.
The Chateau de Ganhac currently a mansion house, a former fief awarded in 1676 to Charles de Broquin who was married to Jeanne de Cambefort.
The Château de Montal, a former fief whose family was originally the Lords of Laroquebrou and Conros, with a castrale chapel under the invocation of Saint Michael. It then became the property of the La Roque-Montal family.
The Chateau de La Prade, purchased in 1756 by Marie-Françoise de Broglie, the widow of Charles Robert de Lignerac who did considerable work on the building. Ruined in the French Revolution.
The Arboretum d'Arpajon-sur-Cère
The Parish Church contains several items that are registered as historical objects:
2 Bronze Bells (1781)
A Painting: The Placing in the Tomb (16th century)
A framed Painting: The Baptism of Christ (17th century)
A Sarcophagus (Middle Ages)

The Chateau de Carbonat Picture Gallery

Notable people linked to the commune
 Louis Laparra de Fieux (Arpajon 1651-1706), engineer of fortifications and strategist.
 Édouard Jean Baptiste Milhaud (Arpajon 1766 - Aurillac 1833), member of the National Convention, General, Count of the Empire.
 Eugene d'Humières, man of letters, translator of Kipling.
 Louis Dauzier, politician and mayor of Aurillac under the French Third Republic.
 Antoine Dusserre (Carbonnat 1865-1925), novelist.
 Léo Pons, filmmaker.

See also
Communes of the Cantal department

References

External links

Discovery of an early Christian sarcophagus and medieval sepulchres in sarcophagi at Arpajon-sur-Cère 
Arpajon-sur-Cère on the National Geographic Institute website 
Arpajon on the 1750 Cassini Map

Communes of Cantal